Kyle Gibson may refer to:
 Kyle Gibson (born 1987), American professional baseball pitcher
 Kyle Gibson (basketball) (born 1987), American professional basketball player
 Kyle Gibson (pastor), American pastor and politician